A list of films produced in France in 1953.

A–Z

See also
 1953 in France

External links
 French films of 1953 at the Internet Movie Database
French films of 1953 at Cinema-francais.fr

1953
Films
French